Billy Gumbert (August 8, 1865 – April 13, 1946), was a Major League Baseball pitcher in the 19th century.

He was born William Skeen Gumbert in Pittsburgh, Pennsylvania. His brother Ad Gumbert and great nephew Harry Gumbert were also Major League Baseball pitchers.

He is recognized as the first pitcher in Major League baseball history (third MLB player overall) - and the first player in the then-newly christened National League - to hit a home run in their first at-bat, which he accomplished on June 19, 1890. It would be the only home run of his career.

He also played football as a lineman for the Pittsburgh Athletic Club.

Billy Gumbert died in his home town of Pittsburgh and was buried in Homewood Cemetery.

See also
List of Major League Baseball players with a home run in their first major league at bat

Sources

Pittsburgh Alleghenys players
Pittsburgh Pirates players
Louisville Colonels players
19th-century baseball players
1865 births
1946 deaths
Major League Baseball pitchers
Zanesville Kickapoos players
Johnstown (minor league baseball) players
Wilkes-Barre Coal Barons players
Baseball players from Pittsburgh
Burials at Homewood Cemetery
Pittsburgh Athletic Club (football) players